Shusha Carpet Museum is the Shusha branch of the State Museum of Azerbaijani Carpets and Applied Art, established by the Order of the Ministry of Culture of the Azerbaijan SSR No. 502 of September 26, 1985 to study, preserve and live the traditions of Karabakh carpet weaving. The branch began its activity on May 19, 1987, in the 18th-century mansion belonging to General Samad bey Mehmandarov.

The branch had exhibited pile and weave carpets, carpet products, artistic embroidery, national costumes, jewelry and artistic metal, selected from the main fund of the Azerbaijan State Carpet and Applied Art Museum. 

The military conflict between Azerbaijan and Armenia caused the branch to stop its activities in 1992. On February 29, 1992, 183 of the 246 exhibits (80 pile carpets, 35 weave carpets, carpet products, 29 pieces of embroidery and national clothing, 39 pieces of jewelry) of the Shusha branch were evacuated and transferred to the main fund of the museum.

As of 2020, the Shusha branch is based within Azerbaijan Carpet Museum in Baku. After Azerbaijan took back control of Shusha in the 2020 Nagorno-Karabakh ceasefire agreement, the museum announced plans to return to its original location in Shusha once the building is restored.

See also 

 Shushi Carpet Museum, the Armenian institution which operated in the city from 2011 to 2020

References

1985 establishments in Azerbaijan
Museums established in 1985
Art museums and galleries in Azerbaijan
Decorative arts museums
Art museums in Baku
Textile museums
Jewellery museums
Azerbaijani rugs and carpets
Buildings and structures in Shusha
Culture in Shusha